Oral transmission, literally meaning "passing by mouth", may refer to:

Oral tradition of stories, texts, music, laws and other cultural elements
Oral gospel traditions, referring specifically to the Christian Gospels
Pathogen transmission in medicine and biology